The Bosco Plantation House, near Monroe, Louisiana is a historic plantation house built in about 1835.  It was listed on the National Register of Historic Places in 2009.

It is a one-and-a-half-story frame cottage.

The Boscobel Cottage is one of three Bosco plantation houses, and is in the most preserved condition.

References

Houses on the National Register of Historic Places in Louisiana
Greek Revival architecture in Louisiana
Houses completed in 1835
Ouachita Parish, Louisiana
Plantation houses in Louisiana